Ndidi Kanu (born 26 August 1986) is a Nigerian footballer who played for Odense Q.

Life
Kanu was born in Abuja in 1986. Kanu began paying with the FTC Queens before moving at the start of the season 2003/04 to Denmark. She moved from there to Odense BK in 2006 for six months. In the summer of 2006, she returned their Danish club OB for half a year, after a serious injury to the knee.

Kanu joined in August 2006 back on loan to Nigeria to Remo Queens and returned in February 2007 back to Odense BK.

National
Kanu belongs since 2002 to the Nigeria women's national football team. In the summer of 2003, she was appointed to the 2003 FIFA Women's World Cup pre-selection of 35 players but she did not make the team that played due to an anterior cruciate ligament injury.

References

1986 births
Living people
People from Abuja
Nigerian women's footballers
Nigerian expatriate women's footballers
Nigerian expatriate sportspeople in Denmark
Nigeria women's international footballers
Odense Q players
Expatriate women's footballers in Denmark
Women's association footballers not categorized by position